Christian Dingert (born 14 July 1980) is a German football referee who is based in Lebecksmühle. He referees for TSG Burg Lichtenberg of the Southwest German Football Association. He is a FIFA referee, and is ranked as a UEFA second category referee.

Refereeing career
He has been a full international for FIFA since 2013.

Personal life
Dingert lives in Lebecksmühle, near Kaiserslautern, and has been married since 2008.

See also
List of football referees

References

External links
 Profile at dfb.de 
 Profile at worldfootball.net

1980 births
Living people
People from Kusel (district)
Sportspeople from Rhineland-Palatinate
German football referees
UEFA Europa League referees